Lone Ranger is the first studio album by former Night Ranger guitarist Jeff Watson, released in 1992 through Shrapnel Records.

Track listing

Personnel

Jeff Watson – vocals, guitar, slide guitar, strings, bass, saxophone sampling, engineering, production
Sammy Hagar – scat singing (track 2)
Brad Gillis – guitar (track 2)
Allan Holdsworth – guitar solo (track 3)
Steve Morse – guitar solo (track 9)
Curt Kroeger – synthesizer
Steve Smith – drums (tracks 3, 9)
Carmine Appice – drums (track 4)
Spike Orberg – drums (tracks 2, 6, 7, 8, 10)
Brad Russell – bass guitar (tracks 2, 3, 6, 11)
Randy Coven – bass (tracks 7, 9, 10)
Bob Daisley – bass (track 4)
David Sikes – bass guitar (track 8)
Steve Machtinger – viola (track 8)
Gabriel Flemming – trumpet
Technical
Jerry Marquez – engineering, mixing (tracks 2–4, 7, 8, 10), production
Mark Hutchins – engineering assistance
Steve Fontano – mixing (tracks 1, 5, 6, 9, 11)
Paul Stubblebine – mastering

References

1992 debut albums
Shrapnel Records albums
Jeff Watson (guitarist) albums